Zalán is a Hungarian given name. People with the name include:

Zalán Czene (born 2002), Hungarian footballer
Zalán Keresztes (born 2001), Hungarian footballer
Zalán Kerezsi (born 2003), Hungarian footballer
Zalán Pekler (born 2000), Hungarian sports shooter
Zalán Vancsa (born 2004), Hungarian footballer
Zalán Zombori (born 1975), Hungarian footballer

Hungarian masculine given names